Mordellistena latitarsis is a beetle in the genus Mordellistena of the family Mordellidae. It was described in 1983 by Batten.

References

latitarsis
Beetles described in 1983